Tali County is an administrative area in Terekeka State, South Sudan.

References

Counties of South Sudan